Micropotamogale is a genus of small, otter-like dwarf otter shrews native to riverine habitats of West African rainforests.  They feed on aquatic animals and insects they can find and capture. They are afrotherian mammals most closely related to the tenrecs of Madagascar, but are not closely related to shrews or otters.
 
Two species are recognized:
 Ruwenzori otter shrew (Micropotamogale ruwenzorii)
 Nimba otter shrew (Micropotamogale lamottei)

Conservation
The Ruwenzori otter shrew is considered to be of least concern, while the Nimba otter shrew is classified as vulnerable by the IUCN.

References

Afrosoricida
Mammal genera
Aquatic mammals
Taxa named by Henri Heim de Balsac
Taxonomy articles created by Polbot